Gem & Jewellery Export Promotion Council (GJEPC) is an organisation set up by the Government of India  (GOI) with aim to promote the Indian gem and jewellery industry and its products.

History
The GJEPC was established in 1966 by the Ministry of Commerce and Industry (India), it was one of several Export Promotion Councils started by the Government.  It has its headquarters in Mumbai and Regional Offices in New Delhi, Kolkata, Chennai, Surat and Jaipur. 
The GJEPC was granted an autonomous status in 1998, it is the apex body for the gems and jewellery industry of India and represents almost 7,000 exporters. The Council presents issues to the Government and recommends policy intervention.

Common Facility Centre (CFC)
The GJEPC has set up CFCs in Amreli, Visnagar, Palanpur and Junagadh in Gujarat. The CFC Services include planning, laser sawing and cutting facilities to process diamonds.

Awards
The GJEPC organises the premier jewellery design competition and Awards. It celebrates art, creativity and innovation by honouring the talents in jewellery design.

Seminars
The GJEPC holds the Design Inspirations seminar in Mumbai in February each year. Design Inspirations is an initiative to educate jewellers, designers and students about the upcoming trends in the gems and jewellery sector in India, Europe and the US. It gives in-depth insights into consumer behaviour patterns, aspirations, desires, emotions, feelings; and how to translate them into thematic concepts and visual directions.

Education and Research
There are seven educational institutes across five cities, and four gemological laboratories under the GJEPC.
Indian Institute of Gems & Jewellery (IIGJ): They include Indian Institute of Gems & Jewellery in Mumbai, Jaipur, Delhi, Varanasi and Udupi along with the Indian Diamond Institute in Surat.
Gemmological Institute of India (GII), Mumbai: The institute was established in 1971, the GII is a centre for gemological, training services, Research and Development work.
Gem Testing Laboratory, Jaipur: This is a coloured gemstone centre in Jaipur. It grades and certifies all kinds of stones, its speciality is in coloured gemstones.
Indian Gemological Institute, New Delhi: The Institute is located in New Delhi, IGI serves the gem testing and certification requirements of the industry in North India.

See also
Indian Diamond Institute
Ministry of Commerce and Industry (India)

References

External links 
 www.gjepc.org

Jewellery industry in India
Jewellery organizations
Export promotion agencies of India